Events from the year 1706 in Denmark.

Incumbents
 Monarch – Frederick IV
 Grand Chancellor – Conrad von Reventlow

Events
 16 January – Stege Pharmacy is established in the town of Stege on Møn.
 24 May – Garrisnon Church is inaugurated in Copenhagen.

Undated
 The Tranquebar Mission is established.
 The country house Nlågård outside Copenhagen's northern city gate is constructed by Prince Charles of Denmark.

Publications
 'Thormodus Torfæus: 'Gronlandia antiquæ'', Copenhagen 1706 (new edi. w/notes 1947)

Births
 4 March – Lauritz de Thurah, architect (died 1759)
 22 June – Carl Juel, statesman, councillor, and diocesan governor (died 1767)
 6 October – Princess Charlotte Amalie, princess of Denmark (died 1782)

Deaths
 7 February – Claus Hansen, Governor of the Danish West Indies
 22/23 April – Princess Wilhelmine Ernestine of Denmark, princess (born 1760)

References

 
1700s in Denmark
Years of the 18th century in Denmark